This is a list of Saudi Arabians by net worth. It was compiled by Forbes magazine and released in the year 2008. This is a partial list of the richest people in Saudi Arabia. Other comprehensive lists are published by Arabian Business.

Saudi billionaires

References

Lists of people by wealth
 
Billionaires
Economy of Saudi Arabia-related lists